Vampire: The Masquerade – Bloodhunt is a free-to-play battle royale game developed and published by Swedish developer Sharkmob. It is based on the tabletop role-playing game Vampire: The Masquerade, and is part of the larger World of Darkness series. The game was released on 27 April 2022 for both Microsoft Windows and PlayStation 5.

Overview
Vampire: The Masquerade – Bloodhunt is a battle royale game set in the streets and on the rooftops in Prague, in the World of Darkness. It takes place following a vampire gathering in the city, after which war between the vampire sects broke out and the Second Inquisition became involved. Players take the roles of vampires who try to survive the sect war, battling both each other and an entity who tries to exterminate vampires. They can choose to fight on their own or in a team, and use ranged weapons, melee weapons, and vampiric powers. Players also need to conceal their identities as vampires from humans, a practice called the Masquerade.

Development
Bloodhunt is developed by Sharkmob, a Tencent-owned game developer based in Malmö and London, founded in 2017 by former staff from Massive Entertainment and IO Interactive, as one of three video games they are developing simultaneously. The game is an adaptation of White Wolf Publishing's 1991 tabletop role-playing game Vampire: The Masquerade, and was known internally under the codename Tiger [Project Lonely Fish]. Because of the source material, the developers did research on the Vampire: The Masquerade setting to see how to create an event and location that could enable battle royale gameplay while going against the setting's established lore as little as possible, and portraying Prague accurately to how it appears within the World of Darkness setting.

The game was announced in October 2020 with a teaser trailer, following the leak of a video of the game, and was released in an early-access version for Microsoft Windows on September 7, 2021. The full game was released on April 27, 2022 for both Windows and PlayStation 5, and it is currently free-to-play.

Reception

Vampire: The Masquerade - Bloodhunt received "generally favorable" reviews, according to review aggregator Metacritic.

PC Gamer and Destructoid considered the project odd for its combination of the battle royale genre and the Vampire: The Masquerade setting, with PC Gamer calling it "baffling to fans and non-fans alike". Game Informer called it intriguing and full of potential, however, and PC Gamer said that they thought the game could turn out well considering the development staff's experience.

Notes

References

External links
 

2022 video games
Battle royale games
Dark fantasy video games
Early access video games
Free-to-play video games
PlayStation 5 games
Prague in fiction
Unreal Engine games
Vampire: The Masquerade video games
Video games developed in Sweden
Video games developed in the United Kingdom
Video games set in the Czech Republic
Windows games